T-2 is the second largest telecommunications provider in Slovenia. It was established on 11 May 2004.

T-2 offers VDSL, FTTH, VoIP, 3G and IPTV connectivity to individuals and businesses.
T-2 operates its own network infrastructure in major cities in Slovenia. T-2 was the first ISP to offer VDSL and over own FTTH network Triple play services in Slovenia. 3G access is being supplied by Nokia Siemens Networks.

References

External links

Technology companies established in 2004
Companies based in Maribor
Telecommunications companies of Slovenia